Ivan Vladimirovich Dykhovichny (Russian: Иван Владимирович Дыховичный, 16 October 1947 – 27 September 2009) was a Russian film director and screenwriter.

He directed ten films between 1984 and 2009. His film Music for December was screened in the Un Certain Regard section at the 1995 Cannes Film Festival.

His father Vladimir Abramovich Dykhovichny (1911–1963) was a well-known Soviet song writer, mother Alexandra Iosifovna Sinani was a ballerina. Dykhovichny was a close friend of Vladimir Vysotsky, who dedicated a long poem to him.

Filmography
 Moscow, My Love (1974) — actor
 Sunday Walks (1984) — actor
 Ispytatel (1985) — director
 The Black Monk (1988) — director, screenwriter
 Prorva (1992) — director, screenwriter
 Women's Role (1994) — director, screenwriter
 Music for December (1995) — director, screenwriter
 Krestonosets 2 (1997) — director, actor
 The Kopeck (2002) — director, screenwriter
 Inhalation-Exhalation (2006) — director
 Europe-Asia (2009) — director

References

External links

1947 births
2009 deaths
Writers from Moscow
Soviet film directors
Soviet screenwriters
Russian film directors
Male screenwriters
Soviet Jews
High Courses for Scriptwriters and Film Directors alumni
Soviet male actors
Russian male actors
Deaths from lymphoma
Russian television presenters
Deaths from cancer in Russia
Burials at Novodevichy Cemetery
20th-century Russian screenwriters
20th-century Russian male writers
Jewish Russian actors